California Proposition 60 may refer to:
 California Proposition 60 (1986)
 California Proposition 60 (2004)
 California Proposition 60 (2016)

See also 
 California Proposition 60A (2004)